Andy White (born 28 May 1962) is a Northern Irish singer-songwriter, poet and author, born in Belfast. He started writing poetry and music early, penning a poem called "Riots" aged nine. He attended Methodist College Belfast. He studied English Literature at Robinson College, Cambridge, graduating in 1984.

He released his first EP Religious Persuasion in 1985 on Stiff Records, and debut album Rave on Andy White in 1986. Since then he has released thirteen solo albums plus numerous compilations and live albums, and has collaborated with many other artists including Peter Gabriel, Sinéad O'Connor and English producer John Leckie. White won Ireland's Hot Press Songwriter of the Year Award in 1993.

In 1995, he released an album (Altitude) with Tim Finn (of Split Enz) and Liam Ó Maonlaí (of Hothouse Flowers); the trio recorded as ALT.

His most recent studio album is This garden is only temporary (2022).

A book of lyrics and poems, The Music Of What Happens, was published in 1999 by Belfast-based Lagan Press. In 2009, his first work of prose (21st Century Troubadour) was published, also by Lagan, with a second volume of poetry (Stolen Moments) (Another Lost Shark Press, Brisbane) following in 2011. A double CD collection 21st Century Troubadour (2012), was based around the book of the same name.

After his first two albums with Decca/MCA, a long relationship with roots label Cooking Vinyl, and a live performance album for Real World Records/WOMAD, White currently records for ALT Recordings licensed through UK label Floating World.

White tours often. He has performed live at Glastonbury Festival and many international rock festivals including WOMAD UK (where he hosted the gala finale in 2005), performing at and MCing the main stage at the Fleadh in London, WOMAD festivals in South Africa, USA, Italy, Cacares, Madrid, Singapore and Womadelaide, international folk festivals including Cambridge (UK); Calgary, Winnipeg, Vancouver (Canada); Port Fairy and Woodford (Australia).

White is best known for songs such as "Religious Persuasion", "James Joyce's Grave", "Street Scenes From My Heart", "Italian Girls on Mopeds", and noted for the political and literary content of his work.

In 2011, as a result of a continued friendship with the Canada-based songwriter Stephen Fearing, the two recorded a collaborative album, Fearing & White, part of a collection of songs written at infrequent intervals over the course of a decade. The duo released their second album Tea And Confidences in March 2014.

On the 30th anniversary of Rave on Andy White, a career retrospective Studio Albums 1986–2016 was released on Floating World Records, comprising all twelve studio albums in that period. Three subsequent albums have seen White expand his recording practice, with album content reflecting that of his early work. 

Since touring was curtailed in 2020 White has maintained a strong online presence and in 2022 started the podcast This podcast is only temporary. 

White lives in Melbourne with his son, Sebastian, where he teaches at Melbourne Polytechnic.

Discography
 Rave On Andy White (1986)
 Kiss The Big Stone (1988)
 Himself (1990)
 Out There (1992)
 Destination Beautiful (1994)
 Altitude (under the name ALT with Liam O'Maonlai and Tim Finn) (1995)
 Teenage (1996)
 Compilation (1998)
 Rare (1999)
 Speechless (2000)
 Andy White (2000)
 Boy 40 (2003)
 Garageband (2006)
 Songwriter (2009)
 Fearing and White (2011) – collaboration with singer-songwriter, Stephen Fearing
 21st Century Troubadour (2012)
 How Things Are (2014)
 Tea And Confidences (2014) – collaboration with singer-songwriter, Stephen Fearing
 Imaginary Lovers (2016)
 Studio Albums 1986–2016 (2016)
 The Guilty & The Innocent (2017)
 Time is a Buffalo in the Art of War (2019)
 This garden is only temporary (2022)

Bibliography
 The Music Of What Happens (1999)
 21st Century Troubadour (2009)
 Stolen Moments (2011)

References

External links
Official Website

1962 births
Living people
Male singers from Northern Ireland
Songwriters from Northern Ireland
Musicians from Belfast
Real World Records artists
Alumni of Robinson College, Cambridge
People educated at Methodist College Belfast
ALT (band) members